KEWU-FM (89.5 MHz Jazz 89.5) is a non-profit radio station, licensed to Cheney, Washington, and serving the Spokane metropolitan area. The station is owned by Eastern Washington University and broadcasts a jazz radio format.

KEWU-FM has an effective radiated power of 10,000 watts.  The transmitter is on South Krell Ridge Lane in Spokane Valley, Washington, amid the towers for other Spokane area FM and TV stations.

History
It was called KEWC, as a 10 watt AM station. On November 11, 1963, it moved to the FM Band as KEWU-FM.

KEWU was named the 2005 & 2015 Best Small Market Jazz station 80+ by Jazz Week magazine and Program Director Elizabeth Farriss was named Best Small Market Jazz Programmer for 2005, 2009 and 2015.

KEWU offers over 150 hours of classic and contemporary jazz every week.  That station has expanded its programming over the years to include Big Band, Latin Jazz.  Other specialty programs broadcast on KEWU are The Friday Night Blues and Nightfall.

See also
 List of jazz radio stations in the United States

References

External links
KEWU official website

EWU
Jazz radio stations in the United States
EWU-FM
Radio stations established in 1950
1950 establishments in Washington (state)